The ITF Women's Circuit – Wenshan was a tournament for female professional tennis players played on outdoor hard courts. The event was classified as a $50,000 ITF Women's Circuit tournament. It was held in Wenshan City, China, in 2011–2013.

Past finals

Singles

Doubles

External links 
 ITF search 

ITF Women's World Tennis Tour
Hard court tennis tournaments
Tennis tournaments in China
Recurring sporting events established in 2011
Recurring sporting events disestablished in 2013